The Society of Experimental Test Pilots (SETP) is an international organization dedicated to improving air safety by supporting the education and professional development of test pilots. The society promotes sound aeronautical design and development techniques and encourages the exchange of ideas among its members. SETP was initially formed in 1955 by a small group of US civilian test pilots at a café near Edwards Air Force Base and  has grown to include over 2,400 members from over thirty countries. The society hosts symposia and workshops in the United States, Canada, Europe, and India. Member success is recognized and celebrated by yearly awards in areas including flight test performance, technical management, and flight test safety. The society publishes a record of its activities in Cockpit magazine.

Notable members and friends 
The following tables are drawn from living and deceased society members, honorary fellows, former members, and friends of the society.

Key

Members 
The following table contains current members of the society and those who were members at the time of their death.

 Individual was killed in an aviation-related accident.

Honorary fellows 
The following table contains honorary fellows of the society both living and dead. A complete list of Honorary Fellows is published by the society.

 Individual was killed in an aviation-related accident.

Former members 
The following table contains former members of the society both living and dead. Members may resign from the society by submitting a written notice. The society does not publish the names of former members so inclusion in this table must be determined by reliable sources other than the society itself (e.g. a public statement from the former member, biographies from a reliable source showing membership was dropped, etc).

Friends 
The following table contains individuals who were not eligible for membership but assisted the society in its endeavors and were recognized as a friend of the society. A complete list of friends is published by the society.

References 

Lists of people by organization
Test pilots